Pratima Bandopadhyay (21 December 1934 – 29 July 2004) (born as Pratima Chatterjee aka Pratima Chattopadhyay) was a Bengali playback singer from Kolkata, who sang numerous songs in popular Bengali language movies and non-film as well, particularly during the 1940s, 50s, 60s and 70s. She was also known as Pratima Banerjee.

Early life 
Pratima Bandopadhyay's ancestors came from Baherak, Bikrampur(now Munshiganj), Dhaka, Bangladesh. She lost her father Mani Bhushan Chattopadhyay at the age of one year only. Her mother Kamala Chattopadhyay raised her in their house at Bhabanipur, Kolkata. She started taking lessons in music at a very early age from Sri Prakash Kali Ghoshal.

Career 
Pratima Bandyopadhyay's first record appeared in 1945 through Senola Records. In famous radio programme of Akashvani the song "Amala Kirane" was introduced in the late 40s, another song a duet with Dwijen Mukhopadhyay "He Charupurno somoshikhorini" was introduced in the year 1952 which increased her popularity. She made her debut in playback singing in Bengali films in 1951 when she recorded "Totini ami, Tumi sudurer chand" under the music direction of Shri Sudhirlal Chakraborty in film "Sunandar Biye". Over three decades, she lent her voice to more than 65 Bengali movies and numerous non-film songs.

Death and legacy
After the death of Pratima's husband Shri Amiyo Kumar Bandyopadhyay in 1986, her health deteriorated rapidly, and on 29 July 2004 she breathed her last. She was survived by her daughter Raikishori Bandyopadhyay and son Amarnath Bandyopadhyay and family.

Memoirs 
Pulak Bandyopadhyay, the famous and noted lyricist of Bengal of the yesteryear, mentioned in his memoir: "When the song "Ke prothom kachhe esechhi", written by me and sung by Manna De and Lata Mangeskar, became popular, I received a call from a mysterious fan, praising the lyrics. She did not reveal her name. Since then I used to receive call from her whenever a song written by me became a sensation. At last one day she agreed to come to meet me at certain location in Elgin road at 5 o'clock in the afternoon. I was overwhelmed. The time was approaching, and cleaned my car and got dressed. Then the phone rang. It was Hemanta Mukherjee. He insisted that I should visit his house for creation of Puja songs at 5 o'clock. Pratima Bandopadhyay would be there waiting. All my persuasion to change the date failed. While driving my car towards Hemanta-da's house, the clock was approaching 5, I was thinking about the mysterious lady, and first two lines came in to my mind, "Baro saadh jaage, ekbar tomay dekhi" (I wanna see you just for once). Never heard of the lady ever after. Pratima recorded the song."
Nirmla Mishra recalled: "One night at about 12 o'clock I received a phone call. It was a great surprise for me, because the caller was none other than the famous artist Pratima Bandopadhyay. She told, 'Nirmala, Manab Babu had given us a song. Let us practice it here.' Regularly Pratima Bandopadhyay used to call me after mid night for practice." The song was: Abire Rangalo Ke Amay /Film Mukhujjye Paribar (1956).

Discography

Films

Others 
Musical Opera
Pratima Bandopadhyay also rendered her voice in the following Musical Opera:
Alibaba (Opera) Part-1 & 2 (Children Opera) created by Kshirod Prasad Bidyabinod. Drama: Pranab Ray, Music: V Blsara.
Shree Radhar Manbhanjan (Religious Opera). Compilation: Pranab Ray, Music: Rabin Chattopadhyay.

Music Composition by Pratima Bandopadhyay
 Tandrahara Raat - Hemanta Mukhopadhyay; Lyrics - Debashis Chattopadhyay; Music - Pratima Bandopadhyay; (code 2vY3CeAHI8M).

References

External links 
 

1933 births
2004 deaths
Bengali playback singers
Singers from Kolkata
Indian women playback singers
21st-century Indian women singers
20th-century Indian singers
Women musicians from West Bengal
20th-century Indian women singers
21st-century Indian singers